Darlington Raceway is a race track built for NASCAR racing located in Darlington, South Carolina. It is nicknamed "The Lady in Black" and "The Track Too Tough to Tame" by many NASCAR fans and drivers and advertised as "A NASCAR Tradition." It is of a unique, somewhat egg-shaped design, an oval with the ends of very different configurations, a condition which supposedly arose from the proximity of one end of the track to a minnow pond the owner refused to relocate. This situation makes it very challenging for the crews to set up their cars' handling in a way that will be effective at both ends.

History

Harold Brasington was a retired racer in 1948, who had gotten to know Bill France Sr. while competing against France at the Daytona Beach Road Course and other dirt tracks in the Southeast and Midwestern United States; he quit racing in the late 1940s to concentrate on farming and his construction business. He began planning a new speedway after he noticed the huge crowds while attending the 1948 Indianapolis 500 and thought, "If Tony Hulman can do it here, I can do it back home." Brasington bought 70 acres from farmer Sherman Ramsey, and started making a race track from a cotton and peanut field. However, he was forced to create an egg-shaped oval with one corner tighter, narrower, and more steeply banked because he promised Ramsey that the new track wouldn't disturb Ramsey's minnow pond at the west side of the property. Brasington was able to make the other turn at the east side of the property wide, sweeping, and flat as he wanted. It took almost a year to build the track.

Brasington made a deal in the summer of 1950 with France to run a  race in Darlington on Labor Day that year. The first Southern 500 carried a record $25,000 purse, and was co-sanctioned by NASCAR and its rival Central States Racing Association. More than 80 entrants showed up for the race. Brasington used a 2-week qualifying scheme similar to the one used at the Indianapolis 500. Brasington was also inspired by Indianapolis when he had the 75-car field aligned in 25 rows of three cars. These practices have been curtailed over the years as NASCAR adopted a more uniform set of guidelines with regard to the number of cars which could qualify for a race. The race was won by Johnny Mantz in a car owned by France.

In recent years the track has been reconfigured; since 1997, what was the front stretch is now the back stretch, from late 2003 to early 2004 lights were installed for night racing to take advantage of the cooler temperatures, and the turns have been renumbered accordingly. Seating has been increased to approximately 65,000, although it has been limited by the proximity of a highway behind the back stretch and the minnow pond.

Darlington has something of a legendary quality among drivers and older fans; this is probably due to its long track length relative to other NASCAR speedways of its era and hence the first venue where many of them became cognizant of the truly high speeds that stock cars could achieve on a long track. The track allegedly earned the moniker The Lady in Black because the night before the race the track maintenance crew would cover the entire track with fresh asphalt sealant, in the early years of the speedway, thus making the racing surface dark black. Darlington is also known as "The Track Too Tough to Tame" because drivers can run lap after lap without a problem and then bounce off of the wall the following lap. Racers will frequently explain that they have to race the racetrack, not their competition. Drivers hitting the wall are considered to have received their "Darlington Stripe" thanks to the missing paint on the right side of the car.

On January 28, 2019, it was revealed on ISC's 2018 annual report that the raceway's track seating was reduced from 58,000 to 47,000.

Races

For many years, Darlington was the site of two annual NASCAR Cup Series races. One, the Rebel 400, was held in the spring while the other, the Southern 500, was always held on Labor Day weekend. In 2003, the Labor Day race was given to California Speedway, and the Southern 500 was moved to November 2004 and was run as part of the Chase for the Nextel Cup.

In 2005, NASCAR eliminated the Southern 500 altogether as a result of the Ferko lawsuit, offending many fans who had followed the sport for generations. The race was merged into the  spring race, and moved to Mother's Day weekend. A 500-mile race named after a Dodge vehicle was held for the next four years, before the race was given the Southern 500 moniker in 2009.

The move was the result of several factors. Darlington suffered from poor ticket sales, particularly in the spring. Part of this is due to the track's location in the Textile Belt of South Carolina, where there has been an ongoing general economic decline for many years. Additionally, there is very little of interest to the average fan from outside the Darlington area other than the events at the track itself. Many newer NASCAR venues are near major cities to avoid this problem. A further factor in the move was an ongoing desire by NASCAR to spread its events out over more of the country. However,  the novelty having now worn off of many of these newer races and venues, several of them are now suffering much worse attendance than Darlington has ever experienced.

Darlington received a $10 million upgrade in 2008, the largest investment in the track's history. This followed a $6 million upgrade the previous year, which included an entire repaving of the oval for the first time since 1995.

In 2014, Darlington swapped dates with Kansas Speedway and was run in April. In 2015, the Southern 500 returned to its traditional Labor Day weekend date.

In 2020, Darlington Raceway gained two additional Cup Series races, The Real Heroes 400 and the Toyota 500, and an additional Xfinity Series race, the Toyota 200, as part of NASCAR resuming its season after it was put on hold due to the COVID-19 pandemic. Later in the year, it was revealed that the Truck Series would gain its own spot back onto the schedule, after a nine-year gap between races. The temporary dates became permanent events for all three series in 2021.

On July 28, 2022, the raceway signed Coastal Carolina quarterback Grayson McCall to a name, image, and likeness agreement that would have him promote races at the track and be the face of the raceway.

Records
 NASCAR Cup Series Qualifying: Aric Almirola, 26.705 s – , April 11, 2014
 NASCAR Cup Series Race (500 miles): Matt Kenseth, 3 h 32 min 45 s – , May 2013
 NASCAR Cup Series Smallest Margin of Victory: .002 seconds, Ricky Craven over Kurt Busch, March 16, 2003.
 NASCAR Cup Series Largest Margin of Victory: 14 laps, Ned Jarrett in the 1965 Southern 500.
 NASCAR Xfinity Series Qualifying: Carl Edwards, 27.784 s – , May 9, 2008
 NASCAR Xfinity Series Race (200 miles): Michael Waltrip, 1 h 27 min 13 s – , September 5, 1992
 NASCAR Camping World Truck Series Qualifying: Cole Whitt, 28.273 s – , 2011
 NASCAR Camping World Truck Series Race (200 miles): Bobby Hamilton, 1 h 30 min 9 s – , March 14, 2003

Lap Records
The official race lap records at Darlington Raceway are listed as:

NASCAR Cup Series records
(As of 9-May-2021)

* from minimum 5 starts.

Darlington Raceway Stock Car Museum
The Darlington Raceway Stock Car Museum is an automotive museum that focuses on the history of Darlington Raceway and the sport of stock car racing. Exhibits include race car history, memorabilia and classic cars, including ones driven at Darlington by such famous race car drivers as Richard Petty, Darrell Waltrip, and the 1950 Plymouth that Johnny Mantz drove to win the first Southern 500 at Darlington. The museum also features the National Motorsports Press Association (NMPA) Hall of Fame about the sport of NASCAR racing. Inductees include Alan Kulwicki, David Pearson, Junior Johnson, Lee Petty, Richard Petty and Neil Bonnett.

The museum was conceived by NASCAR race car champion Joe Weatherly, who was killed in a NASCAR Cup Series race at Riverside International Raceway in 1964, and was dedicated to him in 1965. The museum was originally known as the Joe Weatherly Stock Car Museum until it was expanded in 2003.

Film
The 1959 Southern 500 is prominently featured in the 1960 film Thunder in Carolina, starring Rory Calhoun and Alan Hale Jr.
Darlington Raceway is featured in the 1990 film “” Days of Thunder”, starring  Tom Cruise and John C. Reilly

See also
 1950 Southern 500
 Darlington Record Club
 List of NASCAR tracks

References

External links

 Darlington Raceway Official Site
 Map and circuit history at RacingCircuits.info
 
 Darlington Raceway Stock Car Museum
 Darlington Raceway Page on NASCAR.com
 Darlington Raceway Seating Chart

Buildings and structures in Darlington County, South Carolina
NASCAR tracks
Motorsport venues in South Carolina
International Race of Champions tracks
NASCAR races at Darlington Raceway
Tourist attractions in Darlington County, South Carolina
Sports venues completed in 1950
1950 establishments in South Carolina